Glyphipterix barbata is a species of sedge moth in the genus Glyphipterix. It was described by Alfred Philpott in 1918. It is found in New Zealand.

References

Moths described in 1918
Glyphipterigidae
Moths of New Zealand
Endemic fauna of New Zealand
Endemic moths of New Zealand